Peter Wright may refer to:

Writers
Peter Wright (journalist) (born 1953/4), British editor of The Mail on Sunday
Peter Wright (MI5 officer) (1916–1995), author and MI5 counter-intelligence officer
Peter Wright (writer) (1880/1–1957), British author

Entertainers 
Peter Wight (actor) (born 1950), British actor, sometimes credited as Peter Wright
Peter Wright (dancer) (born 1926), British ballet director and choreographer
Pete Wright (musician) (active 1977–1984), British bass player for the band Crass
Peter Wright (organist) (born 1954), British organist
Pete Wright, character in American 1950 crime film noir 711 Ocean Drive

Sportspeople
Peter Wright (American football), American football player in 1893
Peter Wright (Australian footballer) (born 1996), Australian rules footballer
Peter Wright (darts player) (born 1970), Scottish darts player 
Peter Wright (footballer, born 1934) (1934–2012), English football player for Colchester United
Peter Wright (footballer, born 1982), English football player for Halifax Town
Peter Wright (rugby league), Australian rugby league footballer 1970–1971 and coach
Peter Wright (rugby union) (born 1967), Scottish rugby union footballer and coach
Peter Wright (sport wrestler), British wrestler, bronze medalist at the 1920 Summer Olympic Games
Peter Wright (squash player) (born 1943) Australian squash player, three-time World Masters Squash Champion 
Peter Wright (swimmer) (born 1972), American swimmer
Peter Wright (tennis) (born 1963), Irish-American tennis player
Pete Wright (ice hockey) (1927–1989), Canadian ice hockey player
Peter Wright, technical director of Team Lotus in 1990s

Others 
Peter Wright (Jesuit) (1603–1651), beatified English Catholic martyr
Peter Harold Wright (1916–1990), English recipient of the Victoria Cross
Peter Wright (police officer) (1929–2011), British policeman
Peter Wright (scientist), American scientist, NMR spectroscopist
Peter Wright (mining entrepreneur) (1908–1985), Australian mining entrepreneur
Peter Wright (ceramicist) (1919-2003), potter and sculptor
Peter Wright (engineer) (born 1946), British motor racing engineer and aerodynamicist